The 2021–22 season was Hibernian's (Hibs) fifth season of play back in the top league of Scottish football (the Scottish Premiership), having been promoted from the Scottish Championship at the end of the 2016–17 season. Hibs lost 2–1 to Celtic in the League Cup final and by the same score to Hearts in a Scottish Cup semi-final. Earlier in the season they participated in the inaugural edition of the UEFA Europa Conference League, losing to Croatian side HNK Rijeka.

Results and fixtures

Friendlies

Scottish Premiership

Hibs had a significant COVID-19 outbreak in their squad in late October, which caused the postponement of matches at Ross County and Livingston.

Manager Jack Ross  was sacked on 9 December, following a run of seven defeats in nine league matches. After three games under the caretaker management of David Gray, including a League Cup final defeat, Shaun Maloney was appointed manager on 20 December. Hibs won their first two games under Maloney, but a run of one win in 13 league games meant that they were in the bottom six when the league split after 33 games. Maloney was sacked on 19 April, with Gray taking interim charge for the rest of the season.

UEFA Europa Conference League

Having finished third in the 2020–21 Scottish Premiership, Hibs qualified for the newly created Conference League competition. The draw for the second qualifying round, the stage at which Hibs entered, was held on 16 June 2021. They progressed through their first tie with two wins against Andorran side FC Santa Coloma, but were eliminated in the next round by Croatians HNK Rijeka. Hibs had levelled the tie early in the second half of the second leg in Croatia, but a red card for Darren McGregor was followed by the concession of three goals without reply.

League Cup

As one of the clubs that qualified for European competition, Hibs received a bye through to the second round (last 16) of the League Cup. At that stage they were given a home draw against Championship club Kilmarnock. A 2–0 win put Hibs into a quarter-final at Dundee United. Three first-half goals gave Hibs a 3–1 win at Tannadice, which meant that Hibs qualified for a fifth consecutive national cup semi-final. Hibs were drawn to play defending league champions Rangers at that stage.

Hibs did not play a competitive match for almost a month before the semi-final due to a COVID-19 outbreak, which led to the postponement of two league fixtures. Despite this disruption, a Martin Boyle hat-trick put Hibs three goals ahead and they held on for a place in the final with a 3–1 victory. Hibs sacked manager Jack Ross ten days before the final, following a poor run of form in the Premiership. They took the lead in the final, but two goals by Kyogo Furuhashi won the cup for Celtic.

Scottish Cup

As a Premiership club, Hibs entered the 2021–22 Scottish Cup at the fourth round (last 32) stage and were given a home draw against League One club Cove Rangers. Hibs needed extra time to edge past Cove 1–0, and were then drawn away to Championship side Arbroath in the last 16. Wins at Arbroath and Motherwell put Hibs into the semi-finals, where they were paired with Edinburgh derby rivals Hearts. Hibs lost the semi-final 2–1, and manager Shaun Maloney was sacked a few days later.

Player statistics

|-
! colspan=13 style=background:#dcdcdc; text-align:center| Goalkeepers
|-

|-
! colspan=13 style=background:#dcdcdc; text-align:center| Defenders
|-

|-
! colspan=13 style=background:#dcdcdc; text-align:center| Midfielders
|-

|-
! colspan=13 style=background:#dcdcdc; text-align:center| Forwards
|-

Club statistics

League table

Division summary

Management statistics

Transfers
American international Chris Mueller signed a pre-contract agreement with Hibs in July 2021, with the player joining the club in January 2022. Mueller made little impact after joining the club, and was allowed to return to America in May. Raith Rovers teenager Dylan Tait was signed on 31 August 2021, but was loaned back to the Fife club as part of the deal.

During the January transfer window, top goalscorer Martin Boyle was sold to Saudi Professional League club Al Faisaly for around £3 million.

Players in

Players out

Loans in

Loans out

See also
List of Hibernian F.C. seasons

Notes

References

2021-22
Scottish football clubs 2021–22 season
2021–22 UEFA Europa Conference League participants seasons